Namshir may refer to:
 Namshir, Kurdistan
 Namshir District, in Kurdistan Province